Cahit is a Turkish given name for males. It is also used as a surname It is the Turkish form of the Arabic word Jahid (Arabic: جاهِد jāhid), which means "effort, strive" or "endeavour" and stems from the Arabic verb jahada (Arabic: َجَهَد) "to do effort to get something - be laborious; be perseverant; be sedulous; be serious". Notable people named Cahit include:

First name
 Cahit Aral ((1927–2011), Turkish engineer and politician
 Cahit Arf (1910–1997), Turkish mathematician
 Cahit Irgat (1915–1971), Turkish actor
 Cahit Karakaş (born 1928), Turkish engineer and politician
 Cahit Kıraç (born 1956), Turkish bureaucrat
 Cahit Külebi (1917–1997), Turkish poet
 Cahit Ortaç (1908–1980), Turkish politician
 Cahit Ölmez (born 1963), Turkish Dutch actor 
 Cahit Önel (1927–1970), Turkish athlete
 Cahit Özkan (born 1976), Turkish politician
 Cahit Paşa (born 1973), Turkish football player
 Cahit Süme (born 1972), Turkish boxer
 Cahit Tanyol (1914–2020), Turkish writer and sociologist
 Cahit Sıtkı Tarancı (1910–1956), Turkish poet and author
 Cahit Zarifoğlu (1940–1987), Turkish poet and writer

Middle name
 Cemil Cahit Toydemir (1883–1956), Turkish army officer
 Hüseyin Cahit Yalçın (1874–1957), Turkish writer and politician
 Mehmet Cahit Turhan (born 1960), Turkish engineer and civil servant

Surname
 Neriman Cahit (born 1937), Turkish Cypriot poet and autho

Turkish masculine given names
Surnames from given names